Swiped is a 2018 American coming-of-age romantic comedy film directed by Ann Deborah Fishman, who also wrote the screenplay and executive produced. The film stars Kendall Sanders, Noah Centineo, Nathan Gamble, Kristen Johnston, George Hamilton, Leigh-Allyn Baker, Alana Collins Stewart, Christian Hutcherson, Shelby Wulfert, Maddy Curley, Steve Daron, and Kalani Hilliker.

Plot

Introverted freshman college student James is roommates with Lance, a wealthy student who's very successful with girls and only interested in casual hookups. As James stands out as being the strongest student in a basic programming course they share, Lance approaches him initially proposing he do minimal work so noone has to work.

When Lance and his friends decide they want to develop an app for hookups, he talks to James and discovers he's been coding since he was small. Lance enlists him to develop the ultimate hookup app, matching people across the campus with no strings attached. In exchange he will pay for him to transfer to an ivy league school.

James takes over their dorm room so he can work day and night on the app Jungle. The goal of the app is to connect people physically with no commitment of any kind. No numbers or names are exchanged, so the people have guaranteed one-night stands. 

Not wanting to be blamed for Jungle, James asks Lance to claim it as his own. Their computer science professor forgives him from having to do work in her class, as he's supposedly coding constantly. 

Christmas break arrives, and James starts to see the consequences of the app with his divorced parents. His dad brings a very young date to Christmas, who he found on Jungle, then his mother is convinced to try it by friends. He tries to follow her as she meets up with new people, remorseful of his involvement with the app.

The following day, James tries to get his grandparents and their friends to answer a questionnaire on their past sexual and relationship experience. When he finds his mom back on Jungle, he quickly takes it and other similar apps down to stop her. Soon Lance and company hear about it and hound James to get it up and running.

When James gets back to campus, he hides from Lance and friends in Hannah's sorority house. He is allowed to stay only if he creates a relationship app for them. Going back to his room briefly, James is intercepted by Lance et al and they try to force him to stay and get their app running again. He tricks them with a relaxing tea, and scurries back to the sorority.

James stays safe in the sorority house protected by the sisters until Lance leaks to the press James' involvement. When Hannah hears she confronts him, and he confesses that he worked on the app in hopes of connecting with her. As she never downloaded it, it failed in his eyes. James encourages them all to stay off all of the apps to force guys to connect for real. After he confesses his feelings for Hannah, they finally kiss.

Cast
 Kendall Sanders as James Wilson Singer
 Noah Centineo as Lance Black
 Nathan Gamble as Daniel
 Christian Hutcherson as Wesley
 Shelby Wulfert as Hannah Grace Martin
 Chase Victoria as Rachel
 Shein Mompremier as Melody
 Kristen Johnston as Professor Barnes
 George Hamilton as Phil Singer
 Leigh-Allyn Baker as Leah Singer
 Alana Collins Stewart as Sunny Singer
 Maddy Curley as Tiffany
 Steve Daron as Justin
 Kalani Hilliker as Ashley Singer

Production
Principal photography took place in Palm Beach County, Florida in July 2016. The film was released on iTunes and Netflix in the USA on November 6, 2018, and in several other countries, including the UK, Spain, Italy, and Norway, on July 1, 2019.

Reception
Swiped received mostly negative reviews from critics.

References

External links
 
 

2018 films
2010s coming-of-age comedy films
2018 romantic comedy films
American coming-of-age comedy films
American romantic comedy films
Films shot in Florida
Coming-of-age romance films
Films about online dating
2010s English-language films
2010s American films